Niphona furcata is a species of beetle in the family Cerambycidae. It was described by Henry Walter Bates in 1873. It is known from Japan, Taiwan, South Korea, and China. It acts as a parasitoid for the wasp Neurocrassus palliatus.

References

furcata
Beetles described in 1873